Onthophagus luridipennis, is a species of dung beetle found in India, Sri Lanka, Thailand, and Indonesia.

Description
Average length is about 5.5 to 7.5 mm. Body yellowish-brown. Head and pronotum copper or bronze lustre. Male has a pair backwardly produced divergent horns. Female has longer vertex carina.

Adults have been found from feces of several domestic and wild species including cattle, buffalo, Javan surili, East Javan langur, Asian palm civet, and wild boar as well as humans.

References 

Scarabaeinae
Insects of India
Beetles of Sri Lanka
Beetles described in 1858